Mr. Adams and Eve is an American situation comedy television series about a married couple who are both movie stars. It stars Howard Duff and Ida Lupino (who were actually married at the time) and aired on CBS from January 4, 1957, to July 8, 1958.

Synopsis
Eve and Howard Adams are a married couple who are both movie stars and reside in Beverly Hills, California. Eve, who uses her maiden name, Eve Drake, professionally, grew up in a show-business family and tends to be dramatic in both her professional and home lives. Howard is a down-to-earth native of Seattle, Washington, who handles Eve's excesses with patience and indulgence.

The Adamses are under contract to Consolidated Pictures, where the blustery-but-pragmatic Joe "J. B." Hafter is the studio boss. He often pushes the Adamses to make films with exciting, romantic titles which will attract audiences. The Adamses often work with director Max Cassolini. Steve is the Adamses' longtime agent and friend and Elsie the down-to-earth and plain-spoken housekeeper who has worked for them for 12 years and runs the household. Connie Drake is Eve's mother, and Frances and Burt Stewart are friends of Howard and Eve.

Episodes covered many aspects of the Adamses' lives, including disputes with Hafter, negotiations with Steve, problems with movie scripts, and events at the film studio and in their domestic life together.

The Duffs' 6-year old real life daughter, Bridget Duff, also acted in one episode of the series in 1958. She played Mary Pickford in the episode "The Ghosts of Consolidated", which aired on May 6, 1958.

Cast
 Ida Lupino...Eve Adams/Eve Drake
 Howard Duff...Howard Adams
 Hayden Rorke...Steve
 Olive Carey...Elsie
 Alan Reed...Joe "J. B." Hafter
 Lee Patrick...Connie Drake
 Frances Robinson...Louise Stewart (Season 1)
 Dan Tobin...Burt Stewart (Season 1)
 Lawrence Dobkin/Christopher Dark...Max Cassolini

Production

Ida Lupino and Howard Duff were a married couple in real life at the time. The plots of many episodes of Mr. Adams and Eve were based on actual events Lupino and Duff had experienced during their acting careers, albeit exaggerated for comic effect.

Mr. Adams and Eve was a Four Star-Bridget production. Collier Young, who created the show's characters and was its executive producer, was Lupino's ex-husband. Warren Toub, Jr., was the producer. David Rose composed the show's music.

Tiring of the battle for ratings, Lupino and Duff announced in June 1958 that Mr. Adams and Eve would not return for a third season and that instead they would pursue separate television projects for the 1958–1959 season.

Broadcast history

Airing on Fridays at 9:00 p.m. Eastern Time, Mr. Adams and Eve premiered on January 4, 1957. Twenty-five episodes were produced for its first season, the last of them airing on June 25, 1957. After reruns aired during the summer of 1957, the second and final season premiered on September 20, 1957, and consisted of 41 episodes. On February 11, 1958, during the second season, the show moved to 8:00 p.m. Eastern Time on Tuesdays, where it remained for the rest of its run. The last new episode was broadcast on July 8, 1958. Prime-time reruns of Mr. Adams and Eve then aired in its regular Tuesday time slot until September 23, 1958.

Accolades

Ida Lupino was twice nominated for Primetime Emmy Awards for her performance in Mr. Adams and Eve, receiving a nomination in 1958 for "Best Continuing Performance by an Actress in a Leading Role in a Dramatic or Comedy Series" for her work in Season 1 and in 1959 for "Best Actress in a Leading Role (Continuing Character) in a Comedy Series" for her work in Season 2. Richard Kinon received the nomination for "Best Direction of a Single Program of a Comedy Series".

Episodes

Season 1 (1957)
SOURCE

Season 2 (1957–1958)
SOURCE

References

External links
 
 Mr. Adams and Eve opening credits and sponsor on YouTube
 Mr. Adams and Eve episode "They're Off and Running" on YouTube
 Mr. Adams and Eve episode "This Is Your Life" on YouTube
 Mr. Adams and Eve episode "The Mothers" complete episode on YouTube
 Mr. Adams and Eve episode "The Mothers" Part 1 on YouTube
 Mr. Adams and Eve episode "The Mothers" Part 2 on YouTube
 Mr. Adams and Eve episode "The Mothers" Part 3 on YouTube
 Mr. Adams and Eve episode "Academy Award" on YouTube
 Alternative sponsor after end credits of Mr. Adams and Eve on YouTube
 Mr. Adams and Eve welcomes Winston as sponsor with visit to The Bob Cummings Show on YouTube

1950s American sitcoms
1957 American television series debuts
1958 American television series endings
American comedy television series
Black-and-white American television shows
CBS original programming
Television shows set in Beverly Hills, California
English-language television shows
Television series about marriage
Television series about actors